The discography of Scissor Sisters, an American pop group, consists of four studio albums, two extended plays, seventeen singles, two video albums and seventeen music videos. The band was formed in New York City in 2001 by Babydaddy, Jake Shears, Ana Matronic, Del Marquis and Paddy Boom, who was later replaced by Randy Real. After signing a contract with independent record label A Touch of Class in 2002, Scissor Sisters released their debut single "Electrobix". The critical success of its B-side, a cover version of Pink Floyd's song "Comfortably Numb", brought the group to the attention of Polydor Records, which signed them in 2003.

The band then began to work on their debut studio album, Scissor Sisters, which was released in February 2004. It peaked at number one in the United Kingdom and performed well internationally. The album was certified nine times platinum by the British Phonographic Industry (BPI), becoming the best-selling album of 2004 in the UK, and has sold over seven million copies worldwide. Scissor Sisters spawned five singles; "Comfortably Numb" and "Filthy/Gorgeous" became top ten hits in the UK, while "Laura", "Take Your Mama" and "Mary" were moderately successful. The band released their second studio album, Ta-Dah, in September 2006. Topping the charts in numerous countries, including the UK and Ireland, the album was a commercial success. Its lead single, "I Don't Feel Like Dancin'", peaked at number one in the UK and became an international top ten hit. The album produced three more singles: "Land of a Thousand Words", "She's My Man" and "Kiss You Off".

Scissor Sisters worked extensively with producer Stuart Price in recording their third studio album, Night Work, which was released in June 2010. The album reached number two in the UK and number three on the US Dance/Electronic Albums chart. Three singles were released: "Fire with Fire", which topped the US Hot Dance Club Songs chart, "Any Which Way" and "Invisible Light". The band's fourth studio album, Magic Hour, was followed in May 2012. It peaked at number one on the US Dance/Electronic Albums and number four in the UK. The first single from the album, "Only the Horses", charted highly in several countries. It was followed by "Baby Come Home" and "Let's Have a Kiki", the latter of which reached the number-one spot on the US Hot Dance Club Songs.

Studio albums

Extended plays

Singles

Other charted songs

Other appearances

Video albums

Music videos

See also
 List of songs recorded by Scissor Sisters

Notes
 A  Worldwide sales figures for Scissor Sisters as of September 2010.
 B  United Kingdom sales figures for Scissor Sisters as of October 2018.
 C  United Kingdom sales figures for Ta-Dah as of June 2012.
 D  United Kingdom sales figures for Night Work as of June 2012.

References

External links

Discography
Discographies of American artists
Pop music group discographies
Rock music group discographies